Cordelia Slough  is a  tidal watercourse which discharges to the Suisun Slough, which in turn empties into Grizzly Bay in Solano County, California.  The Suisun Slough, fed by the Green Valley Creek and Red Top Creek, provides a productive habitat for a diversity of aquatic flora and fauna.  In particular steelhead migrate up Cordelia Slough to spawn in its two tributaries.

Endangered species
Cordelia Bay is known for its species biodiversity and also for prevalence of endangered species such as Sacramento splittail, Pogonichthys macrolepidotus and the Salt Marsh Harvest Mouse.

Water quality
Some areas which drain into Cordelia Slough from the north are subject to development pressure from the expanding population of the San Francisco Bay Area; correspondingly, there are increasing risks of adverse water quality due to urban surface runoff from such new development. Cordelia Slough is considered a subarea of the Grizzly Island Wildlife Area, which is a State of California designated Wildlife Area.

See also
San Francisco Bay Area watercourses
Suisun Shrew

References

External links
 
Interactive on line map of Cordelia Slough

Wetlands of the San Francisco Bay Area
Rivers of Solano County, California
Rivers of Northern California
Tributaries of San Francisco Bay